Infinity Divine is the debut album by the Norwegian progressive metal band Pagan's Mind. In 2004, the band revisited the album, re-releasing it with re-recorded parts and a new mix, with many songs featuring drastically altered arrangements. The re-recorded version omits the song "Moonlight Pact" and adds "Embracing Fear 2004" and "At the Graves."

Track listing

Personnel

Pagan's Mind
 Nils K. Rue – lead vocals
 Jørn Viggo Lofstad – guitar
 Thorstein Aaby – guitar
 Steinar Krokmo – bass
 Stian Kristoffersen – drums
 Ronny Tegner – keyboards (2004 re-recorded version only)

Additional musicians (original release)
 Ronny Tegner – keyboards
 Bente Aanesen – backing vocals on "Astral Projection"

Production
Original release:
 Recorded by Øyvind Eriksen and Per Sælør at Klyve Lydstudio, Skien, Norway in September–October 2000.
 Mixed by Ronnie Le Tekrø and Dag Stokke at Studio Studio, Nyhagen, Norway in September–October 2000.
 Mastered by Ola Johansen at Masterhuset, Oslo, Norway in October 2000.

Re-recorded version:
 Vocals re-recorded at Images & Words Studio, Skien, Norway in January 2004.
 "Embracing Fear 2004" re-recorded by Espen Mjøen at Mediamaker Studio, Skien, Norway in September 2003.
 Additional editing and engineering by Espen Mjøen at Mediamaker Studio.
 Remixed and mastered by Tommy Hansen at Jailhouse Studio, Denmark in January 2004.

Notes 
 Glen Drover and Gus G. appear on the cover of the King Diamond song "At the Graves," playing the first and second solos, respectively.

References 

2000 debut albums
Pagan's Mind albums